Olaf Hassel (12 May 1898 – 22 August 1972) was a Norwegian amateur astronomer. He was born in Øvre Sandsvær. He is known for his discoveries of the comet Jurlov-Achmarof-Hassel in April 1939 and the nova V446 Herculis on 7 March 1960. Hassel was born deaf.

References

External links
 "Comet Discovered by Amateur Astronomers." Popular Science, September 1939, p. 113.

1898 births
1972 deaths
People from Kongsberg
Norwegian astronomers
Discoverers of comets
Norwegian deaf people
Scientists with disabilities